Core Security by HelpSystems is an American computer and network security company provides cyber threat prevention and identity access management software products and services, including penetration testing, network traffic analysis, threat detection, privileged access management, and identity governance The company’s research arm, CoreLabs, identifies new IT security vulnerabilities, publishes public vulnerability advisories, and works with vendors to assist in eliminating the exposures they find.

In February 2019, HelpSystems acquired the Core Security products from SecureAuth. HelpSystems is a global enterprise software company working in the areas automation and cybersecurity.

History
In 1996, Core Security was founded in Buenos Aires, Argentina. One year later, the CoreLabs Research group was established and published their first advisory.

Core conducted its first penetration test for a U.S. company in 1998. In the same year, Core Security was recognized as an "Endeavor Entrepreneur" by the Endeavor Foundation, a foundation that supports entrepreneurial projects in emerging markets.

In 2000, the company's first U.S. office opened in New York, NY. Two years later, Core released the first and second versions of their flagship penetration testing product, Core Impact Pro.

In 2002, Morgan Stanley became a shareholder in Core, investing USD 1.5 million and retaining a seat on the board.

In 2003, the company's U.S. headquarters was relocated from New York to Boston, MA. Five years later, Mark Hatton became the CEO of Core Security.

In 2009, Core adds development sites in Boston and India. One year later, Core announced the beta of its new security testing and measurement product, Core Insight.

In 2012, Core announces partnership with nCircle. In the same year, Core announces partnership with NT Objectives.

In 2013, Core Security is named to the 2013 Inc. 500/5000 List. The firm, at the time, employed 180 people, 150 of whom are based in Buenos Aires.

In 2014, Core Security Adds Intrinium to its Partner Program and extends its reach to the Pacific Northwest. In the same year, Core Security announced the latest version of its Core Attack Intelligence Platform. Also in 2014, Core Security won the Information Security Magazine and SearchSecurity.com 2014 Readers' Choice Awards for "Excellence in Vulnerability Management."

In December 2015, Core Security was acquired by identity and access management (IAM) company Courion; in May 2016, Courion rebranded itself with the Core Security name.

In July 2016, Core Security Technologies acquired Damballa for $US 9 million.

In 2017, Core Security merged with SecureAuth.

In 2019, HelpSystems acquired the Core Security solutions from SecureAuth.

On March 4, 2020, Core Security by Helpsystems acquired Cobalt Strike.

Research and advisories
According to its website, Core Security's research department, Core Labs, conducts research in system vulnerabilities, cyber attack planning and simulation, source code auditing and cryptography. Core Labs publishes security advisories, technical papers, project information and shared software tools for public use, with its researchers participating in IT security research conferences including the Black Hat Briefings.

See also
 Security testing
 Vulnerability Management

References

External links
 

Computer security software companies
Computer security companies
Data analysis software
Software testing
Technology companies based in the Boston area
Companies based in Buenos Aires
Technology companies established in 1996